Lemsalu may refer to:

Estonian name of Latvian town Limbaži
Marek Lemsalu (born 1972), Estonian football player
Liis Lemsalu (born 1992), Estonian singer, winner of the fourth season of Eesti otsib superstaari

Estonian-language surnames